The  was an infantry division of the Imperial Japanese Army. It was formed on 2 February 1942 at Jinan as a security (class C) division, simultaneously with 58th and 60th divisions. The nucleus for the formation was the 10th Independent Mixed Brigade. As a security division, the 59th Division's backbone consisted of independent infantry battalions, and it did not include an artillery regiment. Its men were drafted from Chiba Prefecture, with reinforcements office located in Kashiwa. The division was initially assigned to the 12th Army.

Action
Upon formation, the 59th Division assumed the security duties of the 10th Independent Mixed Brigade. First fighting against Chinese guerrillas started at Guantao County in June 1942. From August 1942, the division was engaged in an attempt to defeat the forces of Yu Xuezhong. From mid-November 1942, the division participated in the thrust to the east of Jinan, isolating the elements of the Chinese army on the Shandong Peninsula.

In December 1942, members of the 59th Division were involved in the Kantō Incident – a spontaneous mutiny during the transfer to Guantao County. The drafted Yakuza gang members went searching for alcohol and caused the disintegration of the transport company on 27 December 1942. The mutiny was suppressed two days later.

In January 1943, the 59th Division engaged the People's Liberation Army northeast of Jinan. In April 1943, the operations started in Taihang Mountains against the People's Liberation Army. In July 1943 the 54th Infantry Brigade was used to reinforce the 35th Division. The fight on the border of Shandong Province continued until mid-November 1943, however, the PLA troops were not able to take the city from Japan.

In January 1944, some troops were sent to participate in the imminent Battle of Central Henan. The rest of the 59th Division continued to provide security in Shandong Province, with more severe fighting erupting in November 1944.

In March 1945, a mortar company was added to the division. Soon, the 59th Division started the gradual withdrawal from Shandong Province without being replaced. During that time, a scorched earth policy was extensively used, and numerous atrocities, like using coolies to clear minefields, or mass killing of civilians by the 45th Independent Infantry Battalion were recorded. On 30 May 1945, the 59th Division was attached to the Kwantung Army and assigned to 34th Army on 18 June 1945. The last battalions of the 59th Division arrived in Hamhung in early July 1945 and were still fortifying positions, together with the 137th Division, during the Soviet invasion of Manchuria on 9 August 1945 and the surrender of Japan on 15 August 1945.

See also
 List of Japanese Infantry Divisions

Notes
This article incorporates material from Japanese Wikipedia page 第59師団 (日本軍), accessed 12 June 2016

Reference and further reading

 Madej, W. Victor. Japanese Armed Forces Order of Battle, 1937-1945 [2 vols]
Allentown, PA: 1981

Japanese World War II divisions
Infantry divisions of Japan
Military units and formations established in 1942
Military units and formations disestablished in 1945
1942 establishments in Japan
1945 disestablishments in Japan